Aurelio Arteta Errasti (2 December 1879 – 10 November 1940) was a Spanish painter who worked in several styles, including Symbolism, Cubism and Social Realism. He is remembered mostly for his murals.

Biography 
Arteta was born in Bilbao; his father was a farmer and laborer. He began his artistic education at the School of Arts and Crafts in Bilbao. In 1894, his family moved to Valladolid, so his father could find work. After 1897, he attended the Real Academia de Bellas Artes de San Fernando in Madrid. To avoid putting a burden on his family's modest income, he worked at various odd jobs, mostly of an artistic nature, but also danced as a comparsa.  

That same year, he returned to Bilbao, opened a studio, and held his first exhibition.

In 1922, after a series of exhibitions, he painted his first murals at the new branch offices of the Banco de Bilbao in Madrid; twelve frescoes depicting the history of the Basque Country and the banking profession. From then on, he would be known primarily as a muralist. His second major mural was at the seminary chapel in Logroño; from designs by Ricardo Bastida. 

In 1924, he was appointed Director of the Bilbao Fine Arts Museum, but resigned three years later after the city of Bilbao censured some of his acquisitions. Spain's intellectuals came to his support which eventually led to a general criticism of cultural policies under the Primo de Rivera régime. He continued to exhibit and won several awards.

The beginning of the Spanish Civil War found him working as a Professor at the Escuela Técnica Superior de Madrid de Pintura. As a supporter of the Republican side, he found it necessary to move to Barcelona, by way of Valencia and, in 1938, left Spain for Biarritz. In 1940, when it appeared that France would fall to the Nazis, he chose to go into self-exile in Mexico.

When he arrived, he created what would be his last major work: decorations for the dining room of Indalecio Prieto. That November, following the execution of his friend, Julián Zugazagoitia, he and his wife were on their way to the country, to recover from their grief, when they were killed in a streetcar accident in Coyoacán.

References

Further reading
 Miguel Ángel Marrodán, Aurelio Arteta. Colección Temas Vizcaínos, 1979 
 Jaime Brihuega, Aurelio Arteta. Una mirada esencial. Edorta Kortadi, 1988 
 Matilde Marcos Macías, Arteta : estudio de la figura, Euskal Herriko Unibertsitatea, 1998

External links 

Galería Pintores Españoles: Aurelio Arteta @ Foro Xerbar 
 "Símbolos para una época. Género, clase y nación en la obra de Aurelio Arteta", by Nerea Aresti and Miren Llona @ Euskomedia

1879 births
1940 deaths
People from Bilbao
19th-century Spanish painters
Spanish male painters
20th-century Spanish painters
20th-century Spanish male artists
Basque painters
Social realist artists
Cubist artists
Spanish art directors
Road incident deaths in Mexico
Spanish expatriates in Mexico
Spanish expatriates in France
19th-century Spanish male artists